This is a list of years in Azerbaijan. See also the timeline of Azerbaijani history.  For only articles about years in Azerbaijan that have been written, see :Category:Years in Azerbaijan.

Twenty-first century

Twentieth century

Nineteenth century

Eighteenth century

See also 
 Timeline of Baku
 List of years by country

Further reading

External links
 

 
Azerbaijan history-related lists
Azerbaijan